Borommaratchachonnani Road, the most part of which is Highway 338 (ทางหลวงแผ่นดินหมายเลข 338), is a main road in Bangkok's Thonburi side (west bank of Chao Phraya River) and Bangkok Metropolitan Region.

Borommaratchachonnani Road has a starting point at the Borommaratchachonnani Intersection in the areas of Bangkok Noi and Bang Phlat's Pinklao neighbourhood in Bangkok. Then headed to the west through Taling Chan and Thawi Watthana as far as entering the area of Phutthamonthon, Sam Phran in Nakhon Pathom and ending at the intersection with Petchkasem Road in the area of Nakhon Chai Si, total length is 33.984 km (21.117 mi). 

The road was the result of the opening of Phra Pinklao Bridge across to Phra Nakhon area in 1973, the bridge was expanded by construction Somdet Phra Pinklao Road from the foot of the bridge linking Charansanitwong Road. It was later expanded to be Bangkok Noi-Nakhon Chai Si Highway (ทางหลวงสายบางกอกน้อย-นครชัยศรี) in 1979 and completed in 1984. At first, the road has no official name yet, people therefore popularly call it Pinklao-Nakhon Chai Si Road (ถนนปิ่นเกล้า-นครชัยศรี). Until the year 1991, King Bhumibol Adulyadej (Rama IX) graciously named "Borommaratchachonnani" ('King's mother') in honour of his mother, Princess Srinagarindra.

In 1998, a parallel Borommaratchachonnani Elevated Highway was opened to alleviate traffic jams. Total length is 14 km (8.6 mi).

Borommaratchachonnani Road runs through many important places such as Tesco Lotus Pinklao, Central Plaza Pinklao, Chaophraya Hospital, Southern Bus Terminal, Southern Railway, Princess Maha Chakri Sirindhorn Anthropology Centre, Thongsuk College,  Thonburi 2 Hospital, Phutthamonthon, Mahidol University and Prince Mahidol Hall, Thai Human Imagery Museum etc.

Moreover, this road is serves as the location of Borommaratchachonnani Depot, the main terminal and depot of BMTA's bus zone 6, which provides a total of 18 routes. It is located on the inbound side near Khukhanan Loi Fah [Parallel Elevated Highway] Police Station in Thawi Watthana. It moved from the original location, Phutthamonthon Sai 2 Road in Bang Khae and was available for the first day on April 1, 2019.

References

 

Streets in Bangkok
Roads in Thailand
National highways in Thailand